The following outline is provided as an overview of and topical guide to cryptography:

Cryptography (or cryptology) – practice and study of hiding information. Modern cryptography intersects the disciplines of mathematics, computer science, and engineering. Applications of cryptography include ATM cards, computer passwords, and electronic commerce.

Essence of cryptography 
 Cryptographer
 Encryption/decryption
 Cryptographic key
 Cipher
 Ciphertext
 Plaintext
 Code
 Tabula recta
 Alice and Bob

Uses of cryptographic techniques 
 Commitment schemes
 Secure multiparty computation
 Electronic voting
 Authentication
 Digital signatures
 Crypto systems
 Dining cryptographers problem
 Anonymous remailer
 Pseudonymity
 Onion routing
 Digital currency
 Secret sharing
 Indistinguishability obfuscation

Branches of cryptography 
 Multivariate cryptography
 Post-quantum cryptography
 Quantum cryptography
 Steganography
 Visual cryptography

History of cryptography 

 Japanese cryptology from the 1500s to Meiji
 World War I cryptography
 World War II cryptography
 Reservehandverfahren
 Venona project
 Ultra

Ciphers

Classical

Substitution
 Monoalphabetic substitution
 Caesar cipher
 ROT13
 Affine cipher
 Atbash cipher
 Keyword cipher
 Polyalphabetic substitution
 Vigenère cipher
 Autokey cipher
 Homophonic substitution cipher
 Polygraphic substitution
 Playfair cipher
 Hill cipher

Transposition
 Scytale
 Grille
 Permutation cipher
 VIC cipher – complex hand cypher used by at least one Soviet spy in the early 1950s; it proved quite secure for the time

Modern symmetric-key algorithms

Stream ciphers
 A5/1 & A5/2 – ciphers specified for the GSM cellular telephone standard
 BMGL
 Chameleon
 FISH – by Siemens AG
 WWII 'Fish' cyphers
 Geheimfernschreiber – WWII mechanical onetime pad by Siemens AG, called STURGEON by Bletchley Park
 Pike – improvement on FISH by Ross Anderson
 Schlusselzusatz – WWII mechanical onetime pad by Lorenz, called tunny by Bletchley Park
 HELIX
 ISAAC – intended as a PRNG
 Leviathan
 LILI-128
 MUGI – CRYPTREC recommendation
 MULTI-S01 - CRYPTREC recommendation
 One-time pad – Vernam and Mauborgne, patented 1919; an extreme stream cypher
 Panama
 RC4 (ARCFOUR) – one of a series by Professor Ron Rivest of MIT; CRYPTREC recommended limited to 128-bit key
 CipherSaber – (RC4 variant with 10 byte random IV, easy to implement
 Salsa20 – an eSTREAM recommended cipher
 ChaCha20 – A Salsa20 variant.
 SEAL
 SNOW
 SOBER
 SOBER-t16
 SOBER-t32
 WAKE

Block ciphers

 Product cipher
 Feistel cipher – pattern by Horst Feistel
 Advanced Encryption Standard (Rijndael) – 128-bit block; NIST selection for the AES, FIPS 197; Created 2001—by Joan Daemen and Vincent Rijmen; NESSIE selection; CRYPTREC recommendation.
 Anubis – 128-bit block
 BEAR – built from a stream cypher and hash function, by Ross Anderson
 Blowfish – 64-bit block; by Bruce Schneier et al.
 Camellia – 128-bit block; NESSIE selection (NTT & Mitsubishi Electric); CRYPTREC recommendation
 CAST-128 (CAST5) – 64-bit block; one of a series of algorithms by Carlisle Adams and Stafford Tavares, insistent that the name is not due to their initials
 CAST-256 (CAST6) – 128-bit block; the successor to CAST-128 and a candidate for the AES competition
 CIPHERUNICORN-A – 128-bit block; CRYPTREC recommendation
 CIPHERUNICORN-E – 64-bit block; CRYPTREC recommendation (limited)
 CMEA – cipher used in US cellphones, found to have weaknesses.
 CS-Cipher – 64-bit block
 Data Encryption Standard (DES) – 64-bit block; FIPS 46-3, 1976
 DEAL – an AES candidate derived from DES
 DES-X – a variant of DES to increase the key size.
 FEAL
 GDES – a DES variant designed to speed up encryption
 Grand Cru – 128-bit block
 Hierocrypt-3 – 128-bit block; CRYPTREC recommendation
 Hierocrypt-L1 – 64-bit block; CRYPTREC recommendation (limited)
 IDEA NXT – project name FOX, 64-bit and 128-bit block family; Mediacrypt (Switzerland); by Pascal Junod & Serge Vaudenay of Swiss Institute of Technology Lausanne
 International Data Encryption Algorithm (IDEA) – 64-bit block;James Massey & X Lai of ETH Zurich
 Iraqi Block Cipher (IBC)
 KASUMI – 64-bit block; based on MISTY1, adopted for next generation W-CDMA cellular phone security
 KHAZAD – 64-bit block designed by Barretto and Rijmen
 Khufu and Khafre – 64-bit block ciphers
 Kuznyechik – Russian 128-bit block cipher, defined in GOST R 34.12-2015 and RFC 7801.
 LION – block cypher built from stream cypher and hash function, by Ross Anderson
 LOKI89/91 – 64-bit block ciphers
 LOKI97 – 128-bit block cipher, AES candidate
 Lucifer – by Tuchman et al. of IBM, early 1970s; modified by NSA/NBS and released as DES
 MAGENTA – AES candidate
 Mars – AES finalist, by Don Coppersmith et al.
 MISTY1 – NESSIE selection 64-bit block; Mitsubishi Electric (Japan); CRYPTREC recommendation (limited)
 MISTY2 – 128-bit block: Mitsubishi Electric (Japan)
 Nimbus – 64-bit block
 NOEKEON – 128-bit block
 NUSH – variable block length (64-256-bit)
 Q – 128-bit block
 RC2 – 64-bit block, variable key length
 RC6 – variable block length; AES finalist, by Ron Rivest et al.
 RC5 – Ron Rivest
 SAFER – variable block length
 SC2000 – 128-bit block; CRYPTREC recommendation
 Serpent – 128-bit block; AES finalist by Ross Anderson, Eli Biham, Lars Knudsen
 SHACAL-1 – 160-bit block
 SHACAL-2 – 256-bit block cypher; NESSIE selection Gemplus (France)
 Shark – grandfather of Rijndael/AES, by Daemen and Rijmen
 Square – father of Rijndael/AES, by Daemen and Rijmen
 TEA – by David Wheeler & Roger Needham
 Triple DES – by Walter Tuchman, leader of the Lucifer design team—not all triple uses of DES increase security, Tuchman's does; CRYPTREC recommendation (limited), only when used as in FIPS Pub 46-3
 Twofish – 128-bit block; AES finalist by Bruce Schneier et al.
 XTEA – by David Wheeler & Roger Needham
 3-Way – 96-bit block by Joan Daemen
 Polyalphabetic substitution machine cyphers
 Enigma – WWII German rotor cypher machine—many variants, any user networks for most of the variants
 Purple – highest security WWII Japanese Foreign Office cypher machine; by Japanese Navy Captain
 SIGABA – WWII US cypher machine by William Friedman, Frank Rowlett et al.
 TypeX – WWII UK cypher machine
Hybrid code/cypher combinations
 JN-25 – WWII Japanese Navy superencyphered code; many variants
 Naval Cypher 3 – superencrypted code used by the Royal Navy in the 1930s and into WWII

Modern asymmetric-key algorithms

Asymmetric key algorithm
 ACE-KEM – NESSIE selection asymmetric encryption scheme; IBM Zurich Research
 ACE Encrypt
 Chor-Rivest
 Diffie-Hellman – key agreement; CRYPTREC recommendation
 El Gamal – discrete logarithm
 Elliptic curve cryptography – (discrete logarithm variant)
 PSEC-KEM – NESSIE selection asymmetric encryption scheme; NTT (Japan); CRYPTREC recommendation only in DEM construction w/SEC1 parameters
 ECIES – Elliptic Curve Integrated Encryption System, Certicom Corporation
 ECIES-KEM
 ECDH – Elliptic Curve Diffie-Hellman key agreement, CRYPTREC recommendation
 EPOC
 Kyber
 Merkle–Hellman knapsack cryptosystem – knapsack scheme
 McEliece cryptosystem
 Niederreiter cryptosystem
 NTRUEncrypt
 RSA – factoring
 RSA-KEM – NESSIE selection asymmetric encryption scheme; ISO/IEC 18033-2 draft
 RSA-OAEP – CRYPTREC recommendation
 Rabin cryptosystem – factoring
 Rabin-SAEP
 HIME(R)
 Threshold cryptosystem
 XTR

Keys

Key authentication
 Public key infrastructure
 X.509
 OpenPGP
 Public key certificate
 Certificate authority
 Certificate revocation list
 ID-based cryptography
 Certificate-based encryption
 Secure key issuing cryptography
 Certificateless cryptography
 Merkle tree

Transport/exchange
 Diffie–Hellman
 Man-in-the-middle attack
 Needham–Schroeder
 Offline private key
 Otway–Rees
 Trusted paper key
 Wide Mouth Frog

Weak keys
 Brute force attack
 Dictionary attack
 Related key attack
 Key derivation function
 Key strengthening
 Password
 Password-authenticated key agreement
 Passphrase
 Salt
 Factorization

Cryptographic hash functions
 Message authentication code
 Keyed-hash message authentication code
 Encrypted CBC-MAC (EMAC) – NESSIE selection MAC
 HMAC – NESSIE selection MAC; ISO/IEC 9797-1, FIPS PUB 113 and IETF RFC
 TTMAC – (Two-Track-MAC) NESSIE selection MAC; K.U.Leuven (Belgium) & debis AG (Germany)
 UMAC – NESSIE selection MAC; Intel, UNevada Reno, IBM, Technion, & UC Davis
 MD5 – one of a series of message digest algorithms by Prof Ron Rivest of MIT; 128-bit digest
 SHA-1 – developed at NSA 160-bit digest, an FIPS standard; the first released version was defective and replaced by this; NIST/NSA have released several variants with longer 'digest' lengths; CRYPTREC recommendation (limited)
 SHA-256 – NESSIE selection hash function, FIPS 180-2, 256-bit digest; CRYPTREC recommendation
 SHA-384 – NESSIE selection hash function, FIPS 180-2, 384-bit digest; CRYPTREC recommendation
 SHA-512 – NESSIE selection hash function, FIPS 180-2, 512-bit digest; CRYPTREC recommendation
 SHA-3 – originally known as Keccak; was the winner of the NIST hash function competition using sponge function. 
 Streebog – Russian algorithm created to replace an obsolete GOST hash function defined in obsolete standard GOST R 34.11-94.
 RIPEMD-160 – developed in Europe for the RIPE project, 160-bit digest; CRYPTREC recommendation (limited)
 RTR0 – one of Retter series; developed by Maciej A. Czyzewski; 160-bit digest
 Tiger – by Ross Anderson et al.
 Snefru – NIST hash function competition
 Whirlpool – NESSIE selection hash function, Scopus Tecnologia S.A. (Brazil) & K.U.Leuven (Belgium)

Cryptanalysis

Classical
 Frequency analysis
  Contact analysis
 Index of coincidence
 Kasiski examination

Modern
 Symmetric algorithms
 Boomerang attack
 Brute force attack
 Davies' attack;
 Differential cryptanalysis
 Impossible differential cryptanalysis
 Integral cryptanalysis
 Linear cryptanalysis
 Meet-in-the-middle attack
 Mod-n cryptanalysis
 Related-key attack
 Slide attack
 XSL attack
 Hash functions:
 Birthday attack
 Attack models
Chosen-ciphertext
Chosen-plaintext
Ciphertext-only
Known-plaintext
 Side channel attacks
 Power analysis
 Timing attack
 Cold boot attack
 Network attacks
 Man-in-the-middle attack
 Replay attack
 External attacks
 Black-bag cryptanalysis
 Rubber-hose cryptanalysis

Robustness properties
 Provable security
 Random oracle model
 Ciphertext indistinguishability
 Semantic security
 Malleability
 Forward secrecy
 Forward anonymity
 Freshness

Undeciphered historical codes and ciphers 

 Beale ciphers
 Chaocipher 
 D'Agapeyeff cipher
 Dorabella cipher
 Rongorongo
 Shugborough inscription 
 Voynich manuscript

Organizations and selection projects

Cryptography standards
 Federal Information Processing Standards (FIPS) Publication Program – run by NIST to produce standards in many areas to guide operations of the US Federal government; many FIPS publications are ongoing and related to cryptography
 American National Standards Institute (ANSI) – standardization process that produces many standards in many areas; some are cryptography related, ongoing) 
 International Organization for Standardization (ISO) – standardization process produces many standards in many areas; some are cryptography related, ongoing 
 Institute of Electrical and Electronics Engineers (IEEE) – standardization process produces many standards in many areas; some are cryptography related, ongoing 
 Internet Engineering Task Force (IETF) – standardization process that produces many standards called RFCs) in many areas; some are cryptography related, ongoing)

General cryptographic
 National Security Agency (NSA) – internal evaluation/selections, charged with assisting NIST in its cryptographic responsibilities
 Government Communications Headquarters (GCHQ) – internal evaluation/selections, a division is charged with developing and recommending cryptographic standards for the UK government 
 Defence Signals Directorate (DSD) – Australian SIGINT agency, part of ECHELON
 Communications Security Establishment (CSE) – Canadian intelligence agency

Open efforts
 Data Encryption Standard (DES) – NBS selection process, ended 1976
 RIPE – division of the RACE project sponsored by the European Union, ended mid-1980s
 Advanced Encryption Standard (AES) – a "break-off" competition sponsored by NIST, ended in 2001
 NESSIE Project – an evaluation/selection program sponsored by the European Union, ended in 2002
 eSTREAM– program funded by ECRYPT; motivated by the failure of all of the stream ciphers submitted to NESSIE, ended in 2008
 CRYPTREC – evaluation/recommendation program sponsored by the Japanese government; draft recommendations published 2003
 CrypTool – an e-learning freeware programme in English and German— exhaustive educational tool about cryptography and cryptanalysis

Influential cryptographers 
List of cryptographers

Legal issues 
 AACS encryption key controversy
 Free speech
 Bernstein v. United States - Daniel J. Bernstein's challenge to the restrictions on the export of cryptography from the United States.
 Junger v. Daley
 DeCSS
 Phil Zimmermann - Arms Export Control Act investigation regarding the PGP software.
 Export of cryptography
 Key escrow and Clipper Chip
 Digital Millennium Copyright Act
 Digital Rights Management (DRM)
 Patents
 RSA – now public domain
 David Chaum – and digital cash
 Cryptography and law enforcement
 Telephone wiretapping
 Espionage
 Cryptography laws in different nations
 Official Secrets Act – United Kingdom, India, Ireland, Malaysia, and formerly New Zealand
 Regulation of Investigatory Powers Act 2000 – United Kingdom

Academic and professional publications

 Journal of Cryptology
 Encyclopedia of Cryptography and Security
 Cryptologia – quarterly journal focusing on historical aspects
 Communication Theory of Secrecy Systems – cryptography from the viewpoint of information theory

Allied sciences
 Security engineering

See also
Outline of computer science
Outline of computer security

References

Cryptography
Cryptography